Stevie Bonsapia (born 10 May 1988 in Jayapura) is an Indonesian former footballer.

Career
In October 2013, he signed for newly promoted Perseru Serui.

International goals
Stevie Bonsapia: International under-23 goals

Honours

Club
Persipura Jayapura
Indonesia Super League (2): 2008–09, 2010–11

Country
Indonesia U-23
Southeast Asian Games silver medal : 2011

References

External links
 liga-indonesia.co.id
 

Living people
1988 births
People from Jayapura
Papuan people
Indonesian Christians
Persipura Jayapura players
Association football midfielders
Liga 1 (Indonesia) players
Persiba Bantul players
Persiram Raja Ampat players
Perseru Serui players
Badak Lampung F.C. players
Semen Padang F.C. players
Indonesian Premier Division players
Indonesia youth international footballers
Association football fullbacks
Southeast Asian Games silver medalists for Indonesia
Southeast Asian Games medalists in football
Indonesian footballers
Indonesia international footballers
Competitors at the 2011 Southeast Asian Games
Sportspeople from Papua
21st-century Indonesian people